Ben Affleck is an American actor and filmmaker. He made his film debut with a minor part for The Dark End of the Street (1981), and went on to appear in several television shows, including the PBS educational program The Voyage of the Mimi (1984). Affleck played an antisemite in the sports film School Ties (1992) and featured as a regular on the television drama Against the Grain (1993). He gained attention for playing the supporting part of a high-school senior in Richard Linklater's cult film Dazed and Confused (1993), after which he had his first leading role in Rich Wilkes's comedy Glory Daze (1995).

In 1997, Affleck played a comics artist in Smith's art-house success Chasing Amy. He co-wrote the script and starred with Matt Damon in Gus Van Sant's drama film Good Will Hunting , for which they won the Academy Award for Best Original Screenplay. He next starred with Bruce Willis in Michael Bay's $554 million-grossing science fiction film Armageddon (1998), which proved to be his biggest commercial success to that point. In 2000, Affleck co-formed a production company named LivePlanet, which produced Project Greenlight (2001–05, 2015), a television series that provides training to first-time filmmakers. He has served as the executive producer of several projects directed by the winners of the show. Affleck starred in Bay's war film Pearl Harbor (2001), which despite negative reviews was a box office hit. His career subsequently went through a period of decline when he starred in a series of critical and commercial failures, including Gigli (2003). He made a comeback with the biopic Hollywoodland (2006), in which his portrayal of George Reeves earned him a Golden Globe nomination.

In 2007, Affleck made his feature film directorial debut with Gone Baby Gone, a thriller based on the novel by Dennis Lehane, which was critically praised. He went on to act in and direct two acclaimed features for Warner Bros.the crime drama The Town (2010) and the thriller Argo (2012). The latter, about the 1979 Iran hostage crisis in which he played the intelligence agent Tony Mendez, won the Academy Award for Best Picture and Affleck won the Golden Globe and BAFTA for Best Director. In 2014, Affleck played a man accused of murdering his wife in David Fincher's thriller Gone Girl. Two years later, he starred as Batman in the superhero film Batman v Superman: Dawn of Justice (2016), which grossed $873 million to rank as his highest-grossing release, a role he reprised in a few installments set in the DC Extended Universe. He subsequently gained praise for playing a recovering alcoholic in the sports drama The Way Back (2020), Peter II, Count of Alençon in the period film The Last Duel (2021), and a caring father-figure in the drama The Tender Bar (2021).

Film

Television

Music videos

See also
 List of awards and nominations received by Ben Affleck

Notes

References

External links
 

Male actor filmographies
American filmographies
Filmography
Director filmographies